Cui Yingying is a fictional character from "Yingying's Biography", a Chinese story by Yuan Zhen (779–831), and Romance of the Western Chamber, a Chinese play by Wang Shifu (1250–1337?).

Further reading

Fictional Tang dynasty people